Diana is a feminine given name of Latin and Semitic origins.

Variants
 Female: Daiana
 Altered: Dianella
 Hypochoristic: Anella, Nella, Nina Didi, Di

Variants in other languages
 Catalan: Diana
 Croatian: Dijana
 Dutch: Diana, Diantha
 French: Diane
 German: Diana
 Hawaiian: Kiana
 English: Diana, Dianah, Dianna, Dyana, Dyanna, Deanna
 Hypochoristic: Di, Dee
 Latin: Diana
 Portuguese: Diana
 Romani: Daiena
 Romanian: Diana
 Russian: Диана (Diana)
 Serbian: Дијана (Dijana)
 Slovenian: Dijana
 Spanish: Diana

Origin and diffusion
Diana recalls the Greek and Roman goddess Diana. Diana translates to Artemis form latin.  The name can be traced back to the Proto-Indo-European root *dyeu or *dyeus and *div- meaning "to shine" or "sky", dius, deus and diwio, "deity, god, godlike" and  dium meaning Universe. The meanings are therefore "heavenly", "holy", "divine", "demonic", "celestial", "cosmic", "nebulous", "chaotic", "abyssal", "void", "luminous", "shining", and in a broader sense "which brings the day", "which has light", "which has divine power", "which belongs to the void/abyss/chaos" and "which comes from the Universe/outer space".

Diana was already in use as a given name in ancient Rome, but exclusively outside Christian circles, in which it was seen as a pagan name. In Italy, the variant "Daiana", an adaptation based on the English pronunciation, is also common. The French variant "Diane" gained popularity during the 19th century.

People
Diana, Princess of Wales, British humanitarian and member of the British royal family
Diana, Brazilian singer
Diana Álvares Pereira de Melo, 11th Duchess of Cadaval, Portuguese noblewoman
Dianna Agron, American actress
Diana Athill, British literary editor, novelist and memoirist
Diana Beck, English neurosurgeon
Diana Boulay, Canadian artist
Diana Braithwaite, Canadian singer-songwriter
Diana Bulimar, Romanian gymnast
Diana Chalá, Ecuadorian judoka
Diana Chelaru, Romanian gymnast
Diana Churchill, daughter of Sir Winston Churchill
Diana Damrau, German operatic soprano
Diana Davis, Russian figure skater
Diana Davies (athlete), British high jumper 
Diana Davies (actress), British actress
Diana Dean, Canadian artist
Diana DeGarmo, American singer and Broadway actress
Diana degli Andalò, 13th-century Italian Dominican nun and convent superior beatified by the Roman Catholic Church
Diana Dimova (born 1984), Bulgarian badminton player
Diana Dors, English actress
Diana Haddad, Lebanese pop singer
Diana Hajiyeva, Azerbaijani singer-songwriter
Diana Hayden, Miss World 1997 from India.
Diana Hoddinott, British actress
Diana Ibrahim, Lebanese actress and voice actress
Diana Iovanovici Șoșoacă, Romanian lawyer and politician
Diana Jones, American singer-songwriter
Diana Karazon, Jordanian singer
Diana King, Jamaican singer
Diana Kobzanova, Czech topmodel
Diana Körner, German actress 
Diana Kovacheva, Bulgarian lawyer and politician
Diana Krall, Canadian jazz pianist and singer
Diana Kurien, Indian actress
Diana Lie, alias of Iranian-Norwegian model Aylar Lie
Diana MacManus, American backstroke swimmer
Diana Matheson, Canadian football midfielder
Diana Meier, American basketball player and actress
Diana Mitford, English writer, fascist, one of the Mitford sisters 
Diana Msewa, Tanzanian footballer 
Diana Muldaur, American television and film actress
Diana Nyad, American author, journalist, motivational speaker and long-distance swimmer
Diana Pickler, American heptathlete
Diana Pineda, Colombian diver
Diane de Poitiers, French aristocrat
Diana Redhouse, British artist
Diana Rigg, English actress
Diana Ross, American singer and actress
Diana Russell, Duchess of Bedford
Diana Sands, American actress
Diana Šatkauskaitė, Lithuanian handballer
Diana Scarwid, American actress
Diana Silva (footballer), Portuguese professional footballer
Diana Silva (model), Venezuelan model, environmental leader, singer, actress, cabin crew and beauty pageant titleholder
Diana Silvers, American actress and model
Diana Sowle, American actress
Diana Staehly, German actress 
Diana Starkova, French beauty queen, Miss Europe 2016
Diana Stöcker, German politician
Diana Taurasi, Russian-American basketball player
Diana Torrieri, Italian actress
Diana Vaisman, Belarusian-born Israeli sprinter
Diana Vickers, English singer
Diana Vishneva, Russian ballerina
Diana Vreeland, American fashion editor of Harper's Bazaar and editor-in-chief of Vogue
Diana Williams, American journalist for Eyewitness News in New York City
Diana Yukawa, Japanese-British violinist and composer
Mike Diana, American underground cartoonist

Fictional people
Diana, a character in the American TV miniseries V (1983 miniseries) and V The Final Battle
Diana A, fictional mecha, Mazinger Z sidekick, after the demise of Aphrodite A
Diana Burnwood, a character in Hitman
Diana Cavendish, one of the main characters in the anime series Little Witch Academia
Diana (Dyosa), a character in Dyosa
Diana Wrayburn, a character from The Shadowhunter Chronicles by Cassandra Clare
Diana (MÄR), a major antagonist in the manga and anime series MÄR
Diana (Sailor Moon), a fictional cat character in the Japanese anime and manga series Sailor Moon
Diana (V TV series), the main antagonist in the 1980s science fiction TV franchise V
Diana Barry, a character in L. M. Montgomery's Anne of Green Gables
Diana Bishop, the central character of A Discovery of Witches
Diana Lombard, one of the main characters in the French-Canadian animated series Martin Mystery
Diana Prince, the secret identity of the DC Comics superhero Wonder Woman
Diana, Scorn of the Moon, a playable champion character in the multiplayer online battle arena video game League of Legends
Diana the Acrobat, from the Dungeons & Dragons animated series
Diana Davis, the main character in series 5 of the television series Sliders

See also
Anna (given name)
Diana (disambiguation)
Diane (disambiguation)
Jana (given name)

References

Bibliography

Feminine given names
Albanian feminine given names
Bulgarian feminine given names
Circassian feminine given names
Hungarian feminine given names
Irish feminine given names
Italian feminine given names
Lithuanian feminine given names
Polish feminine given names
Portuguese feminine given names
Romanian feminine given names
Russian feminine given names
Spanish feminine given names
Ukrainian feminine given names